Pachyroxochus is a genus of beetles in the family Carabidae, containing the following species:

 Pachyroxochus gabonicus Straneo, 1949
 Pachyroxochus lebisi Straneo, 1949
 Pachyroxochus subquadratus Straneo, 1942

References

Pterostichinae